Walnut Log is a rural unincorporated community along State Route 157, in Obion County, Tennessee.

Popular culture
It is referenced in the Irvin S. Cobb short story "Fishhead".

References

Unincorporated communities in Tennessee
Unincorporated communities in Obion County, Tennessee